Konung Gustaf V:s Pokal (literally: King Gustaf V's Trophy) or, in shorter form, Kungapokalen (literally: The King's Trophy), is an annual international Group One harness event for trotters. It is held at Åby Racetrack in Mölndal, 10 km south of Gothenburg, Sweden. It is a stakes race for 4-year-old stallions and geldings. The purse in the 2009 final was ≈US$273,000 (€200,000), of which the winner Knockout Rose won half.

Origin
In 1941, Åby inaugurated Jubileumslöpningen to celebrate that the track had been open for 5 years. Jubileumslöpningen was raced until 1948. Then, Swedish king Gustaf V donated a trophy to Åby, a trophy that had been produced according to the king's own wishes.  The event changed name and since 1949, The King's Trophy has been an annually recurring event at Åby Racetrack.

Racing conditions
From the start until 1976, the distance of Kungapokalen was 2,200-2,300 meters (1.37-1.43 miles). Between 1977 and 1982, the distance was either 2,140 or 2,160 meters (1.33-1.34 miles). Since 1983, a year of several changes, the distance has been exclusively 2,140 meters. The same year, the starting method was changed from volt start to auto start.

1983 was Kungapokalen for the first time a stakes race solely for Swedish-bred, four-year-old trotters. The same year, Drottning Silvias Pokal, a big event open only for Swedish four-year-old mares, was inaugurated at Åby as well. In 2002, the conditions were changed and Kungapokalen was opened for foreign four-year-olds as well.

The final of the event is preceded by a number of elimination races, taking place approximately ten days before the final. Since 2000, the number of elimination heats has been either three or four per year.

The 2009 Konung Gustaf V:s Pokal 
The three elimination heats of the 2009 event took place on April 30, 14 days before the final. The winners of these heats, Yewish Boko, Lavec Kronos and Reven d'Amour, together with Marshland, were to be considered favourites in the final on April 14, especially since star trotter Maharajah was withdrawn due to illness.

The starting list 
 Lavec Kronos - Johnny Takter (Lutfi Kolgjini)
 Reven d'Amour - Fredrik B. Larsson (Henrik Larsson)
 Yewish Boko - Åke Svanstedt (Timo Nurmos)
 Marshland - Örjan Kilhström (Stefan Hultman)
 Knockout Rose - Erik Adielsson (Stig H. Johansson)
 Maharajah - Did not start
 Lou Kronos - Lutfi Kolgjini
 Insect Face - Robert Bergh (Marcus Lindgren)
 Rakas - Per Lennartsson
 Wiranas Dream - Thomas Uhrberg (Anna Forssell)
 Revenue J:r - Jörgen Sjunnesson (Lutfi Kolgini)
 Noras Bean - Stefan Söderkvist (Ulf Stenströmer)

(Trainer, if other than driver, in parentheses)

The race 
Lavec Kronos took the lead. Lennartsson placed Rakas behind the leader, while Knockout Rose ran as third on the rail. Outside, Lavec Kronos got favourite Reven d'Amour, while second and third favourites, Marshland and Yewish Boko, spent their time further down the field. Yewish Boko made an attempt to attack the two up front (Lavec Kronos and Reven d'Amour) but ended up breaking stride before the final stretch. Knockout Rose was released by Adielsson down the stretch and won by a length before outsider Noras Bean. Rakas came third.

The Stig H. Johansson-trained stallion Knockout Rose, sired by Express Ride, won in 1:57.3f (mile rate)/1:13.1 (km rate).

Past winners

Drivers with most wins
 6 - Sören Nordin
 5 - Stig H. Johansson
 4 - Gösta Nordin
 3 - Tommy Hanné
 3 - Lars Lindberg
 3 - Berndt Lindstedt
 3 - Gunnar Nordin
 2 - Olle Goop
 2 - Olof Persson
 2 - Ragnar Thorngren

Trainers with most wins
 7 - Sören Nordin
 6 - Stig H. Johansson
 4 - Gösta Nordin
 3 - Tommy Hanné
 3 - Gunnar Nordin
 3 - Håkan Wallner
 2 - Lars Lindberg
 2 - Stefan Melander
 2 - Olof Persson
 2 - Ragnar Thorngren

Sires with at least two winning offsprings
 4 - Bulwark (Hetty, Justus, Bulwarkson, Delta)
 4 - Sir Walter Scott (Holly Scott, Fänrik Scott, Magnifik, Roland)
 3 - Dartmouth (Dartster F., Rex Håleryd, Dior Broline)
 3 - Tibur (Mustard, Rebur, Ata Star L.)
 2 - Clean Sweep (Junker, Moneymaker)
 2 - Earl's Mr Will (Indian Will, Duke Abbey)
 2 - Fibber (Clementz, Julius Fibber)
 2 - Lindy's Crown (Atlantic F.C., St Göran)
 2 - Super Arnie (Gigant Neo, Dust All Over)

Mares with at least two winning offsprings
 2 - Grand Duchess (Justus, Delta)
 2 - Gullan Fafner (Magnifik, Roland)

Winning stallions that have also sired winners
 Adept (1957), sire of Najo (1971)
 Baron Karsk (1993), sire of Equalizer (2001)
 Big Noon (1941), sire of Casanova (1954)
 Justus (1946), sire of Jussi (1960)

Winner with lowest odds
 Winning odds: 1.28 - Quiggin (1984)

Winner with highest odds
 Winning odds: 98.62 - Najo (1971)

Fastest winners

Auto start
 1:12.7 (km rate) - Gigant Neo (2002)

Volt start
 1:17.0 (km rate) - Dartster F. (1980)

All winners of Konung Gustaf V:s Pokal

See also
 List of Scandinavian harness horse races

References

Harness races in Sweden